Douglas Caetano Mattoso dos Santos (born 6 January 1981 in Rio de Janeiro, Brazil) is a Brazilian footballer who plays as forward for Águila in Primera División de Fútbol de El Salvador.

Career

Real España 
On 13 October 2007, Caetano made his first goal in the Liga Nacional de Honduras with Real España in a 1–2 defeat against Victoria in the Estadio Francisco Morazán in the 90th minute.

Tijuana 
On 20 July 2008, Caetano made his official debut with Tijuana in the Liga de Ascenso against Académicos de Guadalajara in the Estadio Jalisco, where he scored his first goal in the 69th minute in a 1–1 draw.

Return to Real España 
On 14 January 2009, the 27-year-old forward signed a deal to return to his old club Real España after spending just one season with Tijuana. On 25 February 2009 Caetano scored a goal against Vida in the 25th minute in the Liga Nacional de Honduras.

Olimpia 
On 5 January 2011, Caetano had reached an agreement signing a two-year contract with Olimpia.

On 16 January 2011, Caetano made his debut in the Liga Nacional de Honduras with Olimpia, replacing Anthony Lozano in the 71st minute, in a 1–0 defeat against Hispano in the Estadio Carlos Miranda, Comayagua. On 23 January 2011 he scored his first goal in a league match against Victoria, in a 3–1 victory. On 16 February 2011, he scored his first brace for the club in a 2–1 win over Necaxa.

Honours

Clubs 
Real España
Liga Nacional: 2009–10 A

Individual 
Liga Nacional Top Scorer: 1
 2007-08 C

References 

1981 births
Living people
Brazilian footballers
Brazilian expatriate footballers
C.D. Olimpia players
Real C.D. España players
Juticalpa F.C. players
Rampla Juniors players
Expatriate footballers in China
Expatriate footballers in Mexico
Expatriate footballers in Uruguay
Expatriate footballers in Honduras
Liga Nacional de Fútbol Profesional de Honduras players
Brazilian expatriate sportspeople in China
Brazilian expatriate sportspeople in Mexico
Brazilian expatriate sportspeople in Uruguay
Brazilian expatriate sportspeople in Honduras
Atlético Mexiquense footballers
Association football forwards